Hasan Mast (also Romanized as Ḩasan Mast; also known as Kalāteh-ye Ḩasan Mast and Ḩasanābād) is a village in Howmeh Rural District, in the Central District of Maneh and Samalqan County, North Khorasan Province, Iran. At the 2006 census, its population was 110, in 28 families.

References 

Populated places in Maneh and Samalqan County